The Edge of the Divine is a studio album released by Christian singer Sandi Patty.

Critical reception
Reviews of the album were positive. Today's Christian Music, powered by CCM Magazine, praised the album's music style, and for "venturing into introspective lyrical territory, which is further traced throughout her companion book of the same name." In Christianity Today, Andrew Greer wrote that "Aside from two classically-based tracks, Chance Scoggins (Addison Road, Mandisa) produces a surprisingly hip musical aura for the living legend Sandi Patty, proving that Patty's still versatile and relevant even after thirty years in the biz."

Commercial performance
On May 21, 2011, The Edgde of the Divine peaked at No. 30 on the Billboard Christian Albums chart. It also peaked at No. 45 on the Christian & Gospel Album Sales chart.

Track listing

Awards
The album won a Dove Award for Inspirational Album in 2011.

Charts

References 

2010 albums
Gospel albums by American artists
Sandi Patty albums